The Norwegian Academy of Literature and Freedom of Expression (Det Norske Akademi for Litteratur og Ytringsfrihet) is a Norwegian institution, founded by the poet Knut Ødegård in 2003, and also called Bjørnstjerne Bjørnson-Akademiet.  Its objective is to promote understanding of other cultures and for literary free speech.  The membership includes Norwegian and foreign scholars, authors, politicians and journalists. The organization's 2016 President is Kristenn Einarsson.

The Bjørnson Prize
The association annually awards the international (Bjørnsonprisen) which includes a cash award of 100,000 kroner (approximately €10,000).

Recipients of the award:
 2004 – Vivian Fouad and Samir Morcos (Egypt), for promotion of relations between Muslims and Christians.
 2005 – Esma Redzepova (Republic of Macedonia), for championing the Roma people (gypsies).
 2006 – Hrant Dink, Editor-in-Chief of the Armenian bi-lingual weekly paper Agos (Istanbul).
 2007 – Adunis (pen name for Ali Ahmad Said Asbar), Syrian poet.
 2008 – Ola Larsmo, Swedish writer.
 2009 – Grigory Pomerants and Zinaida Mirkina, Russian philosophers and writers.
 2010 – Milan Richter (Slovakia) and Einar Már Guðmundsson (Iceland), writers.
 2011 – Ola Didrik Saugstad and Marte Wexelsen Goksøyr. 
 2012 – Bishop Thomas of al-Qusiyya and Mair, Wojoud Mejalli and David Zonsheine, human rights activists from Egypt, Yemen and Israel.
 2013 – Yaşar Kemal, Turkish author.
 2014 – Kristin Solberg, Norwegian journalist and author. 
 2015 – Edward Snowden, whistleblower.
 2016 – Cecilia Dinardi, Norwegian children's rights activist. 
 2017 – Bruce Springsteen
 2018 – Johannes Anyuru, Swedish poet and author.

The prize ceremony is held in the autumn in conjunction with the annual seminar held at the historic Bjørnson house in Molde.

References

External links
Bjørnstjerne Bjørnson-Akademiet, official website

Free expression awards
Norwegian literary awards
Awards established in 2003
Literary awards honouring human rights